Luis Abner Mojica Sierra (born 17 August 1988), better known as Ele A el Dominio, is a Puerto Rican Latin trap and reggaeton singer.

Career

Ele A El Dominio is cousins with Jon Z, with whom he made the Super saiyan flow mixtape. His mixtapes and singles have garnered over a million views on YouTube. He has risen to fame with songs such as "No podemos" which had a remix, "De matar tengo hambre", "Yo me la robé", "Maliantiando" and "Pal bote", which captured the eye of fans of underground hip hop. He is controversial for his social media conflicts, including public problems with artists such as Bad Bunny addressed by his track "Me tragué al Pacino" that discusses shooting the rapper and DJ Luian. He also has problems with Anuel AA. El Dominio deliberately resists more commercial topics and music-making methods. His 2017 Mi Perico Remix mixtape with Arcángel, Ñejo and Ñengo Flow proved influential in raising his profile. He also worked with Ozuna in the song "Balenciaga" and with Faraón Love Shady in "Panocha Remix".

References

1988 births
Living people
Latin trap musicians
Puerto Rican reggaeton musicians